This is a list of serial killers who were active between 2020 and the present. A serial killer is typically defined as an individual who murders three or more people, with the murders taking place over a month or longer and including a significant period of time between them. The Federal Bureau of Investigation (FBI) defines serial murder as "a series of two or more murders, committed as separate events, usually, but not always, by one offender acting alone".

Identified serial killers

2020

2021

2022

2023

Unsolved serial killings

See also 

 List of serial killers in the United States
 List of serial killers by country
 List of serial killers by number of victims
 List of serial killers before 1900

References 

Lists of murderers
Serial killers